The , along with the similar KiHa 30 and KiHa 36 series, are Japanese diesel multiple unit (DMU) train types formerly operated by the Japanese National Railways (JNR) and JR Group of companies, and later operated by the private railway operators Kanto Railway and Mizushima Rinkai Railway. They were built from 1961 until 1966, and were widely used around Japan. Most units were withdrawn in 2012 with the exception of those used by private railways, which remained in service. Some were later operated by Philippine National Railways on Bicol Commuter Train since 2015, and on Metro South Commuter services since 2017.

History
About 410 cars were built from 1961 to 1966.

After about 50 years of service, they were replaced by newer railcars. The last units, 30 62, 30 98 and 30 100, were withdrawn from service in December 2012. The units used on Kururi Line services were withdrawn on 1 December 2012, and were replaced by KiHa E130 series units.

Variants
Multiple variants of the KiHa 35 were built, like the KiHa 30 and KiHa 36. The KiHa 35 Series were built to a single cab design, and has toilets, while the KiHa 30 series were built to a double cab design without toilets.

Specifications
Stainless steel construction is used for some sub-variants. They are fitted with Cummins DMH17 diesel engines. The Kururi Line units used DMF14-HZ engines.

Overseas operations

Philippine National Railways

In September 2015, six former Kantō Railway Joso Line KiHa 35 railcars were transferred to Philippine National Railways for use on Bicol Commuter and Metro Commuter services. On 14 and 16 September 2015, KiHa 350 Set 1 and Set 2 were sent to Naga to serve the Bicol Commuter Line.

They are divided into three two-car sets.

Sets 1 and 2 started commercial operation in September 2015 and served the Naga–Legaspi route of the Bicol Commuter Line in the Bicol Region. Because of the steep slopes on the line, they are now pulled by a locomotive.

The third formation (KiHa 3519-3518) was stored at Tayuman shed and is used as a spare car from 2015 to 2017. After two years, it entered service in September 2017, but it takes only one or two round trips a day because of its existence as a spare car.

On 1 August 2018, PNR KiHa 350 Set 3 was used for the soft opening of the Caloocan-Dela Rosa Line.

In 2019, PNR KiHa 350 Set 3 was given a new livery with the use of sticker-wrap and its windows got replaced with polycarbonate panels, removing the need of window grills. On 16 October 2020, DEL 5009 hauled KiHa 350 Set 3 on its transfer to Naga, Camarines Sur, Bicol. Set 3's purpose of transfer to Naga is to serve the Bicol Commuter Line. Set 3 has been servicing the Bicol Commuter Line ever since it went to Naga in 2020.

Resale

Aizu Railway
In 1999, Aizu Railway bought a surplus diesel vehicle from JR East's KiHa 30-18 which was supposedly to be scrapped in 1996 to be modified & converted as a sightseeing diesel car and reclassified as AT-300 series rolling stock. It was remodeled inside Niigata, Japan into chartered-type train which attract tourists to generate better income due to the number of passengers decreased due to the economic slowdown in the late 1990s and the impact on the local economy was large, so it was necessary to take measures to increase transportation demand, such as Okawa Valley It was planned to introduce additional trains for the purpose of appreciating the scenery along the railroad . Due to the business situation of the Aizu Railway, it was difficult to introduce sightseeing vehicles on its own. It appeared as Japan's first self-propelled minecart. It started operation on April 29, 1999, and in the first year it was operated with AT-300 series and AT-150 series coupled together with the same paint livery so that the passengers could evacuate in case of rain, The AT-103 series was also remodeled from July 2000 as a two-car train to be coupled with the AT-103 series . However, The AT-400 series was introduced as a "Oza Toro Train" from 2003 as an observation vehicle as a "Torokko train" of the three-car train was added to Aizuwakamatsu – Aizukōgen-Ozeguchi Station was operated between  July 12, 2003, where  the 13th day express Abukuma been headed over to, Hobara Station – Tsukinoki Station. It was operated two round trips each day. But in 2009, it was replaced by AT-350 series and is currently stored in the Ashinomaki Onsen Station as of now.

Kanto Railway
Kanto Railway's former JR East KiHa 30/35 railcars were renumbered from 1988 to 1993.

KiHa 35 (1988–93)

KiHa 30 (1988–89)

Mizushima Rinkai Railway
In 2014, The KiHa 30 98 and 30 100 were transferred to the Mizushima Rinkai Railway, where they entered service from 12 May 2014.

Preserved examples

Three KiHa 30 and 35 railcars are preserved in the following areas.

KiHa 35-901: Preserved at the Usui Pass Railway Heritage Park.
KiHa 35–70: Preserved at Nikko-shi, Tochigi Prefecture, Japan.
KiHa 30–62: Preserved at the Isumi Railway Kuniyoshi Station in Chiba Prefecture, Japan.

Gallery

References

External links

Train-related introductions in 1961
Diesel multiple units of Japan
Japanese National Railways
East Japan Railway Company
Central Japan Railway Company
West Japan Railway Company
Shikoku Railway Company
Kyushu Railway Company
Philippine National Railways
Rolling stock of the Philippines
Nippon Sharyo multiple units
Tokyu Car multiple units
Fuji rolling stock
Teikoku Sharyo rolling stock
Niigata Transys rolling stock